Clews is a surname. Notable people with the surname include:

Benj Clews, founder of the website Four Word Film Review
Charles Clews (1919–2009), Maltese comedian
Gaylene Clews, Australian runner; wife of Robert de Castella
Henry Clews (1836–1923), American financier
Paul Clews (born 1979), British speedway rider
Richard Clews, English musician; member of the Michael Nyman Band
Vince Clews, (1943-   ), American author, creator "Consumer Survival Kit" (PBS)

See also
Elsie Clews Parsons (1875–1941), American anthropologist